István Ferenczy (February 24, 1792 – July 4, 1856) was a Hungarian sculptor.

Career
Ferenczy made a number of exerted attempts to establish a school of sculpture in Hungary and it was his mission to establish and promote national art in Hungary. However, he proved to be unsuccessful in setting up a sculptural school, but many of his works remain in the Hungarian National Gallery as a symbol of Hungarian art during the first half of the nineteenth century.

Ferenczy died in 1856 in Rimaszombat.

Some works

External links

Biography
 Simon Meller: Istvan Ferenczy lives and works in Budapest, 1908

Members of the Hungarian Academy of Sciences
1792 births
1856 deaths
People from Rimavská Sobota
19th-century Hungarian sculptors
Male sculptors